The Chinese Taipei women's national handball team is the national team of Chinese Taipei. It is governed by the  Chinese Taipei Handball Association and takes part in international handball competitions.

Asian Championship record
 1987 – 5th
 1989 – 4th
 1991 – 5th
 1993 – 6th
 1995 – 4th
 1997 – 5th
 1999 – 5th
 2000 – 7th
 2002 – 5th
 2004 – 4th
 2012 – 7th

External links

IHF profile

Women's national handball teams
Handball
National team